Zachary Taylor (May 9, 1849 – February 19, 1921) was a U.S. Representative from Tennessee.

Biography
Born near Brownsville, Tennessee, Taylor attended J.I. Hall's School near Covington, Tennessee, and was graduated from the Virginia Military Institute at Lexington as senior captain July 4, 1872. He graduated from Cumberland School of Law at Cumberland University, Lebanon, Tennessee, in January 1874. He was admitted to the bar and commenced practice in Covington, Tennessee, in 1878.

Career
Taylor served in the State senate from 1881 to 1883. He was Postmaster of Covington, Tennessee, from July 1, 1883, to January 1, 1885, when he resigned.

Elected as a Republican to the Forty-ninth Congress, Taylor served from March 4, 1885 to March 3, 1887.  He was an unsuccessful candidate for reelection in 1886 to the Fiftieth Congress. He moved to Memphis, Tennessee, and engaged in the general life insurance business.

Taylor was delegate to the Republican National Convention in 1896. He moved to San Antonio, Texas.

Death
Taylor died in Ellendale, Tennessee on February 19, 1921  (age 71 years, 286 days).

References

External links

1849 births
1921 deaths
Republican Party members of the United States House of Representatives from Tennessee
People from Brownsville, Tennessee